Kim Yung-rok (born 17 February 1955) is a South Korean public servant and politician. He served as Member of the National Assembly, Minister of Agriculture. Currently, Kim is serving as the governor of South Jeolla Province. He is a member of the Democratic Party of Korea.

Life
Kim Yung-rok was born in Wando County, South Jeolla Province on February 17, 1955.

Kim entered public office after passing the 21st administrative examination and he was elected to the Member of the National Assembly in 2008. And He was appointed Minister of Agriculture, Food and Rural Affairs in 2017 and later resigned in March 2018 to be elected to governor of South Jeolla Province.

References

External links
 Kim Yung-rok's Blog

1955 births
Living people
Minjoo Party of Korea politicians
People from South Jeolla Province
Governors of South Jeolla Province
Ministers of Agriculture of South Korea
Konkuk University alumni
Maxwell School of Citizenship and Public Affairs alumni